Egbert Cornelis Christiaan de Graeff (11 December 1936 – 7 July 2017) was Jonkheer and a Dutch field hockey player.

Biography 
Egbert de Graeff was a member of the De Graeff family. His father Was Herman Jacob de Graeff (1907-1978), and his grandfather Dirk Georg de Graeff. He played for many years for the field hockey club TOGO from The Hague.

De Graeff appeared in the national hockey team several times and was active at the men's tournament during the 1960 Summer Olympics in Rome, where he took 9th place with the Netherlands.

References

External links
 

1936 births
2017 deaths
Dutch male field hockey players
Olympic field hockey players of the Netherlands
Field hockey players at the 1960 Summer Olympics
Field hockey players from Amsterdam
20th-century Dutch people
Egbert